The ring-tailed lemur has a complex array of distinct vocalizations used to maintain group cohesion during foraging and alert group members to the presence of a predator. The tables below detail calls documented in the wild and studied at the Duke Lemur Center.

References 

Lemurs